Saint-Denis-sur-Loire (literally Saint-Denis on Loire) is a commune in the Loir-et-Cher department in Centre-Val de Loire, France.

It is a suburb of Blois, 7 km northeast of the town, and lies on the river Loire, 63 km southwest of Orléans.

Population

See also
Communes of the Loir-et-Cher department

References

Communes of Loir-et-Cher